Kaeson Trench (born 16 January 2000) is a professional footballer who plays as a defender. Born in Canada, he represents Barbados internationally.

Early life
Trench joined the GSS Academy in Mississauga, Ontario in 2014. In 2016, he joined Notre Dame SC in Barbados. He later joined the Toronto FC Academy.

Club career
In 2018, he began playing for Toronto FC III in League1 Ontario, making his debut on April 29, 2018 against FC London.

In 2020, he played with Cheadle Town FC in the North West Counties Football League Division One South, the tenth tier in England.

In 2021, he began playing with 1812 FC Barrie in League1 Ontario, making his debut on August 21 against the North Toronto Nitros.

International career
At the youth level he captained the Barbados U17s during CFU U-17 Tournament qualifiers. He also played in the 2018 CONCACAF U-20 Championship and 2020 CONCACAF Men's Olympic Qualifying Championship qualification.

Trench made his debut for the Barbados national football team in a 3-0 2019–20 CONCACAF Nations League qualifying loss to El Salvador on 13 October 2018. He also captained the Barbados U20s at the 2018 CONCACAF U-20 Championship.

References

External links

2000 births
Living people
People with acquired Barbadian citizenship
Barbadian footballers
Barbados international footballers
Barbados youth international footballers
Canadian soccer players
Canadian people of Barbadian descent
Sportspeople of Barbadian descent
Association football defenders
Toronto FC players
League1 Ontario players
Black Canadian soccer players
Soccer players from Montreal
Barbados under-20 international footballers
1812 FC Barrie players